is a Japanese autobiographical manga series written and illustrated by Hiromu Arakawa. It was serialized in Shinshokan's manga magazine  from December 2006 to March 2009, when the magazine ceased its publication, and the series was then transferred to Wings in June of the same year. The series is infrequently published. Its chapters have been collected in seven wideban volumes as of October 2021. An anime television series adaptation is set to premiere in July 2023.

Media

Manga
Written and illustrated by Hiromu Arakawa, Hyakushō Kizoku started in Shinshokan's manga magazine  on December 28, 2006. Un Poco ceased its publication with its 17th issue, released on March 28, 2009, and the series was transferred to the publisher's magazine Wings on July 28, 2009. The series is published on an irregular basis. Shinshokan has collected its chapters into individual wideban volumes. The first volume was released on December 11, 2009. As of October 22, 2021, seven volumes have been released.

The manga was digitally published in English by JManga in 2012.

Volume list

Anime
In October 2022, it was announced that the series would receive an anime television series adaptation. It is set to premiere on Tokyo MX and BS Asahi in July 2023.

Reception
Hyakushō Kizoku was one of the Jury Recommended Works at the 16th Japan Media Arts Festival in 2012. The series ranked 42nd on the 2014 "Book of the Year" list from Media Factory's Da Vinci magazine, where professional book reviewers, bookstore employees, and Da Vinci readers participate; it ranked 30th on the 2016 list; and 36th on the 2020 list.

References

Further reading

External links
 

Agriculture and farming in anime and manga
Anime series based on manga
Autobiographical anime and manga
Comedy anime and manga
Shinshokan manga
Shōjo manga
Slice of life anime and manga